26 Vulpeculae is a close binary star system in the northern constellation of Vulpecula, around 644 light years away from the Sun. It is a challenge to view with the naked eye, having an apparent visual magnitude of 6.40. The star is moving closer to the Earth with a heliocentric radial velocity of −63 km/s, and is expected to come within  in around 2.6 million years.

This is a single-lined spectroscopic binary with an orbital period of 11 days and an eccentricity of 0.28. The visible component is a suspected chemically peculiar star with a stellar classification of A5 III, suggesting this is an evolved giant star. It has about 4.6 times the Sun's radius and is radiating 80 times the Sun's luminosity from its photosphere at an effective temperature of 7,888 K.

References

External links
 

A-type giants
Spectroscopic binaries
Vulpecula
Durchmusterung objects
Vulpeculae, 26
196362
101641
7874